The 2012 UEFA European Under-17 Football Championship is an international under-17 age group football tournament to be held in Slovenia from 4 May until 16 May 2012. The eight national teams involved in the tournament are required to register a squad of 18 players; only players in these squads are eligible to take part in the tournament.

Before the start of the tournament, the UEFA administration provides all participating teams with an official form which must be completed with the 18 players participating in the tournament. Two of these 18 players must be goalkeepers. The form must be accompanied by the 18 selected players' passports to prove they are eligible for the tournament.

Any injured or sick goalkeepers and a maximum of two injured or sick players may be replaced upon submission of written medical evidence and approved by the UEFA doctor on duty at the tournament. Replaced players can take no further part in the tournament.

The 18 players must wear set numbers between 1 and 23. No number may be used by more than one player in the course of the tournament. For all matches played in the tournament, players must wear the number indicated on the official list of 18 players.

Players in boldface have been capped at full international level at some point in their career.

Group A

Head coach:  Jean-Claude Giuntini

Head coach:  Gunnar Gudmundsson

Head coach:  Vasil Maisuradze

Head coach:  Stefan Böger

Group B

Head coach:  Miloš Kostič

Head coach: Albert Stuivenberg

Head coach:  Marcin Dorna

Head coach: Patrick Klinkenberg

References

External links
Official tournament squads site at UEFA

UEFA European Under-17 Championship squads
squads